Gene Mayer was the defending champion, but did not participate this year.

Henri Leconte won the title, defeating Mats Wilander 7–6, 6–3 in the final.

Seeds

  Mats Wilander (final)
  Steve Denton (first round)
  Brian Teacher (first round)
  Buster Mottram (third round, defaulted)
  Brian Gottfried (second round)
  Chip Hooper (first round)
  Tomáš Šmíd (third round)
  Mel Purcell (third round)
  Shlomo Glickstein (quarterfinals)
  Vincent Van Patten (first round)
  Mark Dickson (first round)
 N/A
  Heinz Günthardt (first round)
  Wojtek Fibak (semifinals)
  Henri Leconte (champion)
  Jay Lapidus (semifinals)

Draw

Finals

Top half

Section 1

Section 2

Bottom half

Section 3

Section 4

References

 Main Draw

Stockholm Open
1982 Grand Prix (tennis)